The 1958 Bathurst 100 was a motor race staged at the Mount Panorama Circuit near Bathurst in New South Wales, Australia on 7 April 1958. It was contested over 26 laps, a distance of approximately 100 miles. The race was promoted by the Australian Racing Drivers Club Ltd.

The race was won by Doug Whiteford driving a Maserati 300S.

Results

References

Motorsport in Bathurst, New South Wales
Bathurst 100